William Francis Deedes, Baron Deedes,  (1 June 1913 – 17 August 2007) was a British Conservative politician, army officer and journalist. He was the first person in Britain to have been both a member of the Cabinet and the editor of a major daily newspaper, The Daily Telegraph.

Early life and career
Deedes was the second child and only son of landowner Herbert William Deedes and his wife Melesina Gladys, daughter of Philip Francis Chenevix Trench. His younger sister Margaret Melesina married the 21st Baron FitzWalter. He was brought up in the family home of Saltwood Castle until it was sold in 1925. He was educated at Harrow until after his father suffered heavy financial losses from the Wall Street Crash of 1929.

Deedes was forced to leave school a year early and finish his exams with a tutor. Denied a university career, Deedes began his career as a reporter on the Morning Post in 1931, joining The Daily Telegraph when it took over the Post in 1937. Between 1931 and the beginning of the war in 1939, he shared a home in Bethnal Green, with his uncle Wyndham Deedes.

Deedes fought with the British Army in the Second World War, being based initially at Shrapnel Barracks in Woolwich as an Officer in the 2nd Battalion, Queen's Westminsters, one of the Territorial Army  (TA) units of the King's Royal Rifle Corps. He gained the Military Cross near Hengelo, the Netherlands in April 1945. He was also the only officer to serve in 12th King's Royal Rifle Corps (2nd Queen's Westminsters) for the duration of the war. His battalion served as the motorised battalion of 8th Armoured Brigade in the North-west Europe campaign.

Marriage and children
He was married to Evelyn Hilary Branfoot, who died in May 2004, by whom he had two sons (one of whom died young) and three daughters, Juliet, Jill and Lucy.

A convinced Christian like his father, he lived very unpretentiously on the edge of Romney Marsh, Kent, where his wife, Hilary, kept a menagerie of farm animals. He was never particularly well-off, preferring to use public transport whenever possible.

His son, Jeremy Deedes, is a director of the Telegraph Group of companies and was (2008–2012) a director of lobbyists Pelham Bell Pottinger. He has been a Director of the Tote, Chairman of The Sportsman newspaper, and is currently a director of Warwick Racecourse.

Lucy Deedes is a former Master of Foxhounds and was the first wife of Crispin James Alan Nevill Money-Coutts, 9th Baron Latymer. She is the mother of society magician Drummond Money-Coutts and the journalist Sophia Money-Coutts.

Politics
Deedes came from a family with a tradition of public service. He was very proud of the fact that there had been a Deedes member of parliament in every century since 1600.

Deedes was elected as the Conservative Member of Parliament (MP) for Ashford in 1950. First serving as a junior minister under Winston Churchill for three years, he later entered Harold Macmillan's Cabinet in 1962 as Minister without Portfolio. He left the Cabinet in 1964, as Minister of Information, and subsequently stood down as an MP at the October 1974 election.

Journalism and later life
He was editor of The Daily Telegraph from 1974 to 1986 and, after he was replaced by Max Hastings, continued his career as a journalist. His tenure was noted for battles with the print unions.

Deedes was created a life peer on 23 September 1986, becoming Baron Deedes, of Aldington in the County of Kent, but he always preferred to be addressed as "Bill", rather than "Lord Deedes".

He was the subject of This Is Your Life in 1998, when he was surprised by Michael Aspel.

After the 1999 Australian republic referendum, Deedes wrote in The Daily Telegraph: "I have rarely attended elections in any country, certainly not a democratic one, in which the newspapers have displayed more shameless bias. One and all, they determined that Australians should have a republic and they used every device towards that end."

He continued to comment on social and political issues through his newspaper columns until his death. In his later years, he gained a cult fanbase after two memorable appearances on Have I Got News for You and was, at the age of 88, the oldest guest ever to have appeared on the programme until 2012, when Baroness Trumpington appeared at the age of 90.

He was also a stalwart member of the Carlton Club and was appointed as an ambassador for UNICEF in 1998, running high-profile campaigns against landmines. In 2006, he wrote in an opinion piece for The Daily Telegraph that Islam "is the only faith on Earth that persuades its followers to seek political power and impose a law – sharia – which shapes everyone's style of life" and added that Islam "forbids" Muslims from conforming with British society. He continued to write into his 94th year, with his final article, published on 3 August 2007, about Darfur.

He died on 17 August 2007 at his home in Kent, at 94, after a short illness. The residential street Bill Deedes Way, in the village of Aldington, near Ashford, is named after him.

Popular culture

Scoop
According to many sources, Deedes was the journalist used by Evelyn Waugh as the model and inspiration for the hapless William Boot, protagonist of the satirical novel Scoop. Deedes himself said he "spent part of my life brushing aside the charge," but admitted "that my inexperience and naivety as a reporter in Africa might have contributed a few bricks to the building of Boot." The two had reported together in 1936, trying to cover the Second Italo-Abyssinian War; Deedes arrived in Addis Ababa aged 22 with almost 600 pounds of luggage. Berhanu Kebele, Ethiopian ambassador to London, pointed out that Deedes's sharp journalistic instincts ensured Italian excesses were kept in the public eye.

Barring the question of age, a more appropriate model for Boot is William Beach Thomas who, according to Peter Stothard, "was a quietly successful countryside columnist and literary gent who became a calamitous Daily Mail war correspondent" in World War I.

Dear Bill
Deedes was close to Margaret Thatcher and her husband Denis. The spoof letters "from" Mr. Thatcher which appeared in satirical magazine Private Eye throughout the Thatcher years were always addressed to Dear Bill – the "Bill" in question was usually assumed to be Deedes; however some instalments (e.g. 16 May and 28 November 1986) would suggest otherwise. The two men regularly played golf together, with Deedes claiming it was a public service to take the spouse of the Prime Minister away from the stress of being married to the country's head of government.  The Eye also based its long-running editorial comment, "Shome mishtake shurely?", on Deedes' distinctive slur.

Publications
 Swift and Bold: The Story of the King's Royal Rifle Corps in the Second World War 1939-1945, coedited with Sir Hereward Wake, Aldershot: Gale & Polden, 1949
 At War with Waugh: The Real Story of "Scoop", Macmillan, 2003 
 Brief Lives, Macmillan, 2004 
 Dear Bill: A Memoir, Macmillan, 2005 
 Words and Deedes: Selected Journalism 1931-2006, Macmillan, 2006,

Arms

Notes

External links
 The Daily Telegraph obituary, 17 August 2007
 A tribute to Lord Deedes: The Daily Telegraph
 "Gentleman journalist remembered" - BBC News Online, 18 August 2007
 
 

1913 births
2007 deaths
20th-century British journalists
British Army personnel of World War II
British newspaper editors
Conservative Party (UK) MPs for English constituencies
Conservative Party (UK) life peers
Deputy Lieutenants of Kent
English male journalists
English newspaper editors
Knights Commander of the Order of the British Empire
Members of the Privy Council of the United Kingdom
Ministers in the Eden government, 1955–1957
Ministers in the Macmillan and Douglas-Home governments, 1957–1964
Ministers in the third Churchill government, 1951–1955
People educated at Harrow School
Queen's Westminsters officers
Recipients of the Military Cross
UK MPs 1950–1951
UK MPs 1951–1955
UK MPs 1955–1959
UK MPs 1959–1964
UK MPs 1964–1966
UK MPs 1966–1970
UK MPs 1970–1974
UK MPs 1974
Military personnel from Kent
Life peers created by Elizabeth II